Anita Thompson can refer to:
 Anita Thompson Dickinson Reynolds (1901–1980), African-American model, dancer, and actress
 Anita Thompson, née Bejmuk, the assistant and wife of Hunter S. Thompson